Ned Long is a professional Australian Rules Football player who plays for  as a midfielder or forward in the AFL. He has also played for Box Hill Hawks in the Victorian Football League.

Early life

Long represented Victoria in the Under 15 School Sport competition along side future  teammate Josh Ward. Long had impressive early in 2021 until injury saw him drop down the ratings in the eyes of recruiters. Overlooked in the main draft Hawthorn selected him with their first pick of the rookie draft. He was educated at Northcote High and Melbourne Grammar.

AFL career 

Statistics 
Updated to the end of the 2022 season.

|-
| 2022 ||  || 27
| 1 || 0 || 0 || 10 || 1 || 11 || 7 || 1 || 0.0 || 0.0 || 10.0 || 1.0 || 11.0 || 7.0 || 1.0 || 0
|- class="sortbottom"
! colspan=3| Career
! 1 !! 0 !! 0 !! 10 !! 1 !! 11 !! 7 !! 1 !! 0.0 !! 0.0 !! 10.0 !! 1.0 !! 11.0 !! 7.0 !! 1.0 !! 0
|}

References

External links

Hawthorn Football Club players
Box Hill Football Club players
People educated at Melbourne Grammar School
Northern Knights players
2003 births
Living people